Paul Apostol (born October 23, 1945) is an American fencer. He competed in the individual and team sabre events at the 1972 and 1976 Summer Olympics.

A resident of Wyckoff, New Jersey, Apostol has been a fencing coach at Ramapo High School.

References

External links
 

1945 births
Living people
American male sabre fencers
Olympic fencers of the United States
Fencers at the 1972 Summer Olympics
Fencers at the 1976 Summer Olympics
People from Wyckoff, New Jersey
Sportspeople from Bergen County, New Jersey
Sportspeople from New York City
Pan American Games medalists in fencing
Pan American Games silver medalists for the United States
Fencers at the 1975 Pan American Games